BG VOZ (stylized as BG:VOZ) is an urban rail system that serves the city of Belgrade, Serbia. It is operated by the public transit corporation GSP Belgrade and is a part of the integrated BusPlus system.

Lines in service

Line 1

BG:Voz began service between New Belgrade and Pančevo Bridge stations on September 1, 2010. Starting from April 15, 2011, the line has been extended westward to Batajnica. Further extension across the Danube, towards Krnjača and Ovča in 2016, was financed from the RZD International credit. The total travel time between the first and the last stop is 50 minutes. At peak times, trains run every 15 minutes.
That line currently contains 13 stations (corresponding to Srbija voz Line 55 and Belgrade public transport Line 100):

New Belgrade
Belgrade center
Karađorđev Park

Pančevo Bridge
Krnjača–most

Line 2

The second line, between Belgrade Center and Resnik, began revenue operations on April 13, 2018. Service frequency is one train every half hour. The line was extended towards Ovča in order to partially compensate for the reductions in service on the first line. However, due to the nature of Belgrade railway junction, it temporarily bypasses the Belgrade Center station.
The line currently has the following stations

Karađorđev Park

Pančevo Bridge
Krnjača–most

Line 3
Line 3 was introduced on September 1st, 2019. On working days, it operates three times per day in both directions. 
Currently, it has 12 stations:
Belgrade center

Line 4
Line 4 began operation on December 15, 2019. It connects Belgrade southwest municipal towns of Lazarevac and Barajevo with Resnik, city centre and Danube's left bank. It has two sub-routes: Lazarevac-Resnik and Lazarevac-Ovča. It operates six times per day.
The longer sub-route has 15 stations in total:

 (note: terminus for the shorter sub-route)

Karađorđev Park

Pančevo Bridge
Krnjača–most

References

External links
 City of Belgrade Secretariat for Transport

Public transport in Serbia
Transport in Belgrade
Underground commuter rail